The 2018 Sánchez-Casal Mapfre Cup was a professional tennis tournament played on clay courts. It was the first edition of the tournament which was part of the 2018 ATP Challenger Tour. It took place in Barcelona, Spain between 8 and 14 October 2018.

Singles main-draw entrants

Seeds

 1 Rankings are as of 1 October 2018.

Other entrants
The following players received wildcards into the singles main draw:
  Bekkhan Atlangeriev
  Nicola Kuhn
  Álvaro López San Martín
  Miguel Semmler

The following players received entry from the qualifying draw:
  Roberto Marcora
  Jordi Samper Montaña
  Tak Khunn Wang
  Miljan Zekić

Champions

Singles

  Roberto Carballés Baena def.  Pedro Martínez 1–6, 6–3, 6–0.

Doubles

  Marcelo Demoliner /  David Vega Hernández def.  Rameez Junaid /  David Pel 7–6(7–3), 6–3.

References

Sánchez-Casal Mapfre Cup